Lärchwand is a mountain of Bavaria, Germany. It was an exclave of Luxembourg before 1869.

Mountains of Bavaria
Mountains of the Alps